Governor Borton may refer to:

Arthur Borton (British Army officer) (1814–1893), Governor of Malta from 1878 to 1884
Neville Travers Borton (1870–1938), Military Governor of Jerusalem in 1917